Col du Télégraphe is a mountain pass in the French Alps situated above the Maurienne valley between the eastern end of the massif d'Arvan-Villards and the massif des Cerces.

The pass links Saint-Michel-de-Maurienne to the north and Valloire to the south, as well as forming an access point to the col du Galibier via its north face.

The route is often used during the ascent to Col du Galibier in the Tour de France, and is thus popular with cyclists.

Details of the climb 

The maximum gradient is 9.8% at the summit. On this side mountain pass cycling milestones are placed every kilometre. They indicate the current height, the distance to the summit, the average slope in the following kilometre, and the number of the street. As of July 2015, some milestones are missing in the middle part of the climb.

The Tour de France 

The Col du Télégraphe was first used in the Tour de France in 1911; the first rider over the summit was Emile Georget.

Since 1947, the Col du Télégraphe has been crossed 29 times by the Tour de France. On several of those occasions it has not been ranked for points in the King of the Mountains competition, being treated as part of the descent from the Col du Galibier, and has been ranked for points only 18 times.

Appearances in the Tour de France (since 1947)

See also
 Fort du Télégraphe, the fortification at the crest of the pass, the location of the semaphore station that gave the pass its name
 Souvenir Henri Desgrange

External links 

Profile on climbbybike.com
Le col du Télégraphe dans le Tour de France 
Col du Télégraphe on Google Maps (Tour de France classic climbs)

Mountain passes of the Alps
Mountain passes of Auvergne-Rhône-Alpes
Landforms of Savoie
Transport in Auvergne-Rhône-Alpes